Aur Pappu Pass Ho Gaya is a 2007 Bollywood comedy film directed by S. L. Soni and produced by Amit Srivastava.The film features Krishna Abhishek and Kashmira Shah in title roles with ensemble cast of supporting actors.

Cast
Krishna Abhishek as Pappu
Kashmera Shah as Kiran Chauhan
Jackie Shroff as Sudhakar 'Sudhabhai' Chauhan
Sikandar Kharbanda as Biloo
Alok Nath as Pappu's dad
Mushtaq Khan as Pathan
KK Goswami

Production
While shooting for the film Krishna Abhishek and Kashmera Shah fell in love.

Soundtrack
The music of the film is composed by Ravi Chopra.

Track listing

References

External links
 

2007 films
2007 comedy films
2000s Hindi-language films
Indian comedy films